Lorenzo Dow Harvey (November 23, 1848 – June 1, 1922) was an American educator who served as Superintendent of Public Instruction of Wisconsin in the late 1880s and early 1900s.

Early life and career
Harvey was born in Deerfield, New Hampshire, and moved with his parents to Wisconsin in 1850, settling in Fulton, Wisconsin. Harvey earned his bachelor's degree from Milton College in 1872, and earned his master's degree from Milton in 1876.

Harvey served as principal of Mazomanie High School in Mazomanie, Wisconsin from 1873 to 1875, and from 1875 to 1880 he served as principal of Sheboygan High School in Sheboygan, Wisconsin. In 1880, Harvey was admitted to the bar.

He moved to Oshkosh, Wisconsin in 1885 to serve as conductor of institutes and professor of political economy at the Oshkosh Normal School. Harvey served as president of the Wisconsin State Normal School in Milwaukee, Wisconsin from 1892 to 1898. He was president of the Wisconsin Teachers' Association from 1890 to 1891.

Political career
Harvey was elected State Superintendent of Public Instruction in 1898 and served two terms, from 1899 to 1903.  He was defeated for renomination in 1902, and moved to Menomonie, Wisconsin where he served as superintendent of the public school system from 1903 to 1908. In 1908 he was named president of the Stout Institute at Menomonie in Menomonie, Wisconsin, which would later become the University of Wisconsin-Stout. Harvey served as president until his death in 1922. He was a member of the National Education Association, and served as vice president from 1908 to 1909 and president from 1909 to 1910.

See also
 List of Superintendents of Public Instruction of Wisconsin

References

External links

People from Deerfield, New Hampshire
People from Fulton, Wisconsin
People from Mazomanie, Wisconsin
Politicians from Sheboygan, Wisconsin
Politicians from Oshkosh, Wisconsin
People from Menomonie, Wisconsin
Superintendents of Public Instruction of Wisconsin
Wisconsin Republicans
Educators from Wisconsin
Wisconsin lawyers
Presidents of the National Education Association
Milton College alumni
University of Wisconsin–Oshkosh faculty
University of Wisconsin–Milwaukee faculty
University of Wisconsin–Stout faculty
1848 births
1922 deaths
19th-century American lawyers